Moussé Doubai Tapé or Thierry Doubai (born 1 July 1988 in Adjamé) is an Ivorian footballer who plays for Ivorian club AFAD.

Career

Young Boys 
On 22 August 2007, BSC Young Boys signed Doubai from AS Athletic D'Adjame. In 2008, the 21-year-old Doubai was injured and has been left out for several months. In mid 2009, he returned in training and is very close to his comeback at the first team in Bern. He spent a four-year spell playing 77 matches for Young Boys with two goals.

Udinese 
On 2 July 2011, Doubai agreed to a five-year contract with Serie A club Udinese.

Sochaux 
Six months after signing with Udinese, on 17 January 2012, he joined French club FC Sochaux-Montbéliard on loan until the end of the season. Following the season, Sochaux took up the option to make the loan move permanent, signing Doubai to a four-year contract.

Bnei Yehuda F.C.
On 17 August 2015 Doubai signed with Bnei Yehuda Tel Aviv F.C. which was promoted to the Israeli Premier League. He made his Bnei Yehuda F.C. debut on 22 August and scored the first goal in a 3–0 away win against Maccabi Haifa F.C. at Sammy Ofer Stadium. Later on that season Doubai lost his place in the Bnei Yehuda line-up, and in July 2016 the team announced his release.

International career
On 26 March 2008, Doubai made his debut for Ivory Coast against Tunisia.

Personal life
Thierry is the older brother of the professional footballer Kouadio Pascal Doubaï.

References

External links 
Player profile on Bnei Yehuda Tel Aviv website

1988 births
Living people
Ivorian footballers
Ivorian expatriate footballers
BSC Young Boys players
Swiss Super League players
Udinese Calcio players
Serie A players
FC Sochaux-Montbéliard players
FC Luzern players
Bnei Yehuda Tel Aviv F.C. players
Ligue 1 players
Israeli Premier League players
Expatriate footballers in Italy
Expatriate footballers in France
Expatriate footballers in Switzerland
Expatriate footballers in Israel
Association football midfielders
Ivory Coast international footballers
Footballers from Abidjan
Academie de Foot Amadou Diallo players